The 1960 Ohio Bobcats football team was an American football team that represented Ohio University during the 1960 NCAA College Division football season. In their third season under head coach Bill Hess, the Bobcats won the Mid-American Conference (MAC) championship, compiled a perfect 10–0 record (6–0 against MAC opponents), shut out five of ten opponents, and outscored all opponents by a combined total of 269 to 34.  They played their home games in Peden Stadium in Athens, Ohio.

The Bobcats also won the NCAA College Division national championship. They were ranked No. 1 in the final UPI small college poll with 348 points, ahead of Lenoir–Rhyne by more than 100 points.

The highlight of the season was a November 12 victory over defending national champion Bowling Green. The victory snapped Bowling Green's 18-game winning streak. The Bobcats also defeated the No. 8 Miami Redskins, snapping an 18-year jinx in the annual Battle of the Bricks rivalry game.

Schedule

References

Ohio
Ohio Bobcats football seasons
NCAA Small College Football Champions
Mid-American Conference football champion seasons
College football undefeated seasons
Ohio Bobcats football